Trpc4-associated protein is a protein that in humans is encoded by the TRPC4AP gene.

Model organisms 

			
Model organisms have been used in the study of TRPC4AP function. A conditional knockout mouse line, called Trpc4aptm1a(KOMP)Wtsi was generated as part of the International Knockout Mouse Consortium program — a high-throughput mutagenesis project to generate and distribute animal models of disease to interested scientists.

Male and female animals underwent a standardized phenotypic screen to determine the effects of deletion. Twenty five tests were carried out on mutant mice and three significant abnormalities were observed.  Few homozygous mutant embryos were identified during gestation, and thus fewer than expected survived until weaning. The remaining tests were carried out on heterozygous mutant adult mice; females had an abnormal anagen phase of the hair cycle.

Interactions 

TRPC4AP has been shown to interact with TNFRSF1A.

See also 
 TRPC

References 

Ion channels
Genes mutated in mice